Several places are known as Lake Park:

Canada
 Burns Lake Park
 Como Lake Park (British Columbia)

Malaysia
 Raub Lake Park

South Korea
 Gwanggyo Lake Park

 Ilsan Lake Park
 Seokchon Lake Park
 Seonam Lake Park
 West Seoul Lake Park

United Kingdom
 Boating Lake Park

United States
 Beaver Lake Park (Washington)
 Bradley Lake Park
 Brushy Lake Park (Sallisaw, Oklahoma)
 Burke Lake Park
 Chippewa Lake Park
 Clearlake Park, California
 Clear Lake State Park (California)
 Clear Lake State Park (Michigan)
 Clove Lakes Park
 Como Lake Park
 Conneaut Lake Park
 Crooked Lake Park, Florida
 Crystal Lake Park, Missouri
 Hilltop Lake Park
 Lake Park Estates, Dallas
 Lake Park, Florida
 Lake Park, Georgia
 Lake Park High School, Roselle, Illinois
 Lake Park, Indiana
 Lake Park, Iowa
 Lake Park, Milwaukee, Wisconsin, urban park designed by Frederick Law Olmsted
 Lake Park, Minnesota
 Lake Park, North Carolina
 Lake Park Township, Becker County, Minnesota
 Leisure Village West-Pine Lake Park, New Jersey
 Lettuce Lake Park
 Moon Lake Park
 Mountain Lake Park (San Francisco)
 Mountain Lake Park, Maryland
 Onondaga Lake Park
 Penn Lake Park, Pennsylvania
 Pine Lake Park, New Jersey
 Round Lake Park, Illinois
 Ruffey Lake Park
 Salmon Lake Park
 Sawgrass Lake Park
 Scriber Lake Park
 Shady Lake Park
 Spring Lake Park (Illinois)
 Summit Lake Park
 Swan Lake Park
 Zorinsky Lake Park
 Lake Park, original name of Grant Park (Chicago)
 Lake Park, name sometimes applied to the Union Base-Ball Grounds of the 1870s and 1880s in Chicago
 Lake Park, part of the Des Plaines, Illinois Park District, with Lake Opeka as its highlight